George O'Neil (13 September 1896 – 23 May 1940) was an American poet, playwright, novelist and film writer.

O'Neil was born in St. Louis, Missouri, and died in Hollywood, California.

Works

Narrative

 That Bright Heat (Boni and Liveright, 1928)
 Tomorrow's House; or, The Tiny Angel, illustrated by Rose Cecil O'Neill (E. P. Dutton, 1930) – brother–sister collaboration
 Special Hunger (Liveright, (c)1931) – "A presentation of the life of Keats",

Filmography
 

 High, Wide, and Handsome
 Intermezzo (1939 film)
 Magnificent Obsession
 Sutter's Gold (1936)
 Yellow Dust (1936) 
 Beloved (1934)
 Only Yesterday (1933)

References

External links

George O'Neil papers, 191?-1935, held by the Billy Rose Theatre Division, New York Public Library for the Performing Arts
 
 

1896 births
1940 deaths
20th-century American dramatists and playwrights
20th-century American male writers
20th-century American novelists
20th-century American poets
20th-century American screenwriters
American male dramatists and playwrights
American male novelists
American male poets
American male screenwriters
Novelists from Missouri
Screenwriters from Missouri